Ian Charles Dargie (3 October 1931 – 27 November 2015) was an English professional footballer and coach, who played as a centre half. He is best remembered for his 11-year spell in the Football League with Brentford, for whom he made over 280 appearances.

Playing career

Brentford 
Dargie began his career Southern League club Tonbridge and joined Second Division club Brentford in February 1952. He made his debut for the club on 19 April 1952 in a 4–1 defeat to Hull City as an inside right. After moving back to centre half, Dargie endured a slow start to his time at Griffin Park, failing to make a breakthrough into the first team until after the Bees were relegation to the Third Division South in 1954, making 22 appearances during the 1954–55 season. Dargie became an integral part of the team was an ever-present during the 1957–58 season, appearing in all 46 league games.

Towards the end of the 1958–59 season, Brentford looked poised to secure promotion back to the Second Division and in recognition of his record of 100th consecutive league appearances, Dargie was handed the captaincy for a league match versus Southampton on 9 March 1959. Brentford won 6–0 at The Dell. A cracked shinbone suffered on Easter Saturday 1959 sidelined Dargie for the remainder of the campaign and the team's defensive record worsened. Dargie was again an ever-present during the 1960–61 season, making a career-high 51 appearances. Brentford suffered relegation to the Fourth Division in 1962 and Dargie fell behind Peter Gelson and Mel Scott in the pecking order. He departed the club at the end of the 1962–63 Fourth Division title-winning season and failed to make enough appearances to qualify for a medal. Dargie made 281 appearances and scored two goals during his time with the Bees and was posthumously inducted into the club's Hall of Fame in May 2018.

Non-league football 
Dargie dropped into non-league football in 1963 and joined Southern League First Division club Yiewsley.

Later career and death 
After his retirement, Dargie became physio and youth team coach at Crystal Palace, serving the club until 1982. He was part of the coaching staff at Charlton Athletic between 1985 and 1988, before reverting to an administrative role. He died on 27 November 2015 in Haverfordwest, Wales, at the age of 84.

Honours 

Brentford Hall of Fame

Career statistics

References

1931 births
2015 deaths
Footballers from Camberwell
English footballers
Brentford F.C. players
Tonbridge Angels F.C. players
Hillingdon Borough F.C. players
English Football League players
Southern Football League players
Crystal Palace F.C. non-playing staff
Charlton Athletic F.C. non-playing staff
Association football wing halves
Association football inside forwards